Elbow is a feature on Earth's Moon, a crater in the Hadley–Apennine region.  Astronauts David Scott and James Irwin visited the east rim of it in 1971, on the Apollo 15 mission, during EVA 1.  The east rim of Elbow was designated Geology Station 1 of the mission.  Geology Station 2 was to the southwest of the crater, up the slope of Mons Hadley Delta.

Elbow is located on the edge of Hadley Rille, about 1 km northeast of the larger St. George crater, and about 3.2 km southwest of the Apollo 15 landing site itself.

The Apollo 15 Preliminary Science Report describes Elbow as follows:

The crater was named by the astronauts after its location at a bend, or elbow, in Hadley Rille, and the name was formally adopted by the IAU in 1973.

Samples
The following samples were collected from Elbow Crater (Station 1), as listed in Table 5-II of the Apollo 15 Preliminary Science Report.  Sample type, lithology, and description are from Table 5-IV of the same volume.

External links
 Apollo 15 Traverses, Lunar Photomap 41B4S4(25)

References

Impact craters on the Moon